Taiwan's Wild Lily student movement or March student movement was a six-day student demonstration in 1990 for democracy. The sit-in at Memorial Square in Taipei (since rededicated as Liberty Square in commemoration of the movement) was initiated by students from National Taiwan University. Participation quickly grew to 22,000 demonstrators. The Wild Lily demonstrators sought direct elections of Taiwan's president and vice president and new popular elections for all representatives in the National Assembly.

The demonstration lasted from 16 to 22 March 1990, coinciding with the inauguration of Lee Teng-hui on 21 March to a six-year term as president. The election Lee won was one in which only the 671 members of the National Assembly voted, only one party was recognized, and one candidate ran. This process had been characteristic of one-party rule under the Kuomintang and Chiang Kai-shek.

Protesters wore white Formosa lilies and created giant replicas of the flower as a symbol of democracy. Their adoption of the flower as an icon of freedom evoked a long native tradition. Yang Yung-ming, a professor of political science at the National Taiwan University, described it to the Taiwan Review in 2003:

For years, Taiwanese poets have employed this flower as a symbol of grace and resilience. The aboriginal poet Lin Yi-te, for example, often used it to symbolize the Taiwanese indigenous peoples' primitive purity of spirit, and used the flower's decline to dramatize the desolation and tragedy of their decline. It was Taiwanese literature's use of this wild lily [Lilium formosanum] as a metaphor of simplicity and fortitude that inspired its use by those in the student democracy movement.

On the first day of his new term, Lee Teng-hui welcomed fifty students to the Presidential Building. He expressed his support of the students' goals and promised full democracy in Taiwan beginning with reforms to be initiated that summer.

The Wild Lily student movement marked a crucial turning point in Taiwan's transition to pluralistic democracy. Six years later, Lee became Taiwan's first popularly elected leader, taking 54% of the vote in an election in which over 95% of eligible voters participated. Democracy supporters continue to gather at Liberty Square every 21 March to commemorate the event. Officials affiliated with the Taiwan Solidarity Union have advocated moving Taiwan's Youth Day to 21 March in recognition of the students' achievement.

On the eve of the fifteenth anniversary of the ill-fated student democracy protests in China's Tiananmen Square, Lee's successor Chen Shui-bian noted that the Wild Lily student movement had taken place only a year after the events in Beijing. He noted the contrast in the way the governments responded. "The most memorable impression of the Tiananmen incident of June 4th is that of that small, thin person holding up a line of tanks, which was a heroic and disturbing impression," he said. "The March Student Movement, in pressing for the establishment of a national affairs conference, changing the way the Legislative Yuan and the National Assembly are elected and a consensus on realizing the direct election of the president, also set a timetable for reform." The National Assembly voted to dissolve itself in 2005.

See also
 Sunflower Student Movement
 Wild Strawberries Movement
 Taiwanization 
 1989 Tiananmen Square protests

References

Citation

Sources
 'Taipei Spring? Anachronistic process, but Lee promises reforms.' Taiwan Communique, International Committee for Human Rights in Taiwan, April 1990. Retrieved 7 September 2007.
 Jewel Huang. "TSU proposes changing date of Youth Day to March 21." Taipei Times, 22 March 2005. Retrieved 7 September 2007.
 Lin Chieh-Yu. "Chen says 'China won't trust its people.'" Taiwan Headlines, 4 June 2004. Retrieved 7 September 2007.
 Abby Lee. "Botanists' labor of love revives Formosan lily population." Taiwan Review, 26 December 2003. Retrieved 7 September 2007. Video. Spoken commentary in Chinese and Taiwanese. Retrieved 7 September 2007.

Student protests in Taiwan
Taiwan under Republic of China rule
20th century in Taipei
Politics of Taiwan
1990 in Taiwan
Taiwanese democracy movements
White Terror (Taiwan)